The freshwater islands in Scotland include those within freshwater lochs and rivers – including tidal areas, so the islands may not always be surrounded by freshwater. It has been estimated that there are at least 31,460 freshwater lochs in Scotland and that 1.9 per cent of the land surface is covered by freshwater. The distribution has a north-west to south-east gradient, with the highest concentrations occurring on the islands of the Outer Hebrides.

The more notable freshwater islands include Lochindorb Castle Island, Loch Leven Castle Island, St Serf's Inch and Inchmahome, each of which have had a role to play in Scottish history. Inchmurrin, the largest freshwater island in the British Isles, is in Loch Lomond, which contains thirty or more other islands.

Various names are used repeatedly. Similarly,  is the Gaelic for 'island'. A common suffix for offshore islands in the north of Scotland is "-holm", derived from the Old Norse , meaning a 'small and rounded islet'. This list excludes artificial crannógs and the numerous small freshwater islands with no recorded name.

Larger islands

This table includes all of the freshwater islands that exceed  in size and/or are populated.

Inchlonaig and Inchcruin are classified by the National Records of Scotland as "inhabited islands but had no usual residents at the time of either the 2001 or 2011 censuses." It is likely that Eilean Aigas is inhabited, at least from time to time as well, although it was not listed as such by the Census in 2001 or 2011.

In mainland lochs 

Loch Awe is Scotland's longest loch and abounds with islands and crannógs. Several of the islands are, or have in the past, been inhabited; there are two castles and the remains of a chapel on the islands. Inistrynich, Eilean na Maodail, Eilean Dubh and Liever Island are all promontories as opposed to islands despite their names. The loch's water levels have fluctuated so some of them may have been islands in recent history, as the promontory  on which Kilchurn Castle stands once was.

There may be up to sixty islands in the Loch Lomond including Inchmurrin, the largest freshwater island anywhere in the Britain and Ireland, and Inchconnachan, which has hosted a small population of Red-necked Wallaby since at least 1975.  The isolated strongholds of Lochindorb Castle and Loch an Eilein Castle were once in the hands of the 14th century nobleman Alexander Stewart, the infamous "Wolf of Badenoch". There are numerous unnamed small islands in mainland lochs, including those where the water level has been artificially raised by the creation of dams for the production of hydro-electricity. This process has created new islands that would previously have been small eminences.

On offshore islands 

There are relatively few genuine islands in the lochs of the Inner Hebrides, many of those that do exist being artificial crannógs. By contrast there are innumerable small islands in the estimated 7,500 lochs of the Eilean Siar, only a small proportion of which are named by the Ordnance Survey.

The Orkney and Shetland archipelagos to the north are similarly lacking in freshwater islands. Law Ting Holm is the former location of the national þing, or Norse parliament of Shetland.

In rivers 

These are islands in freshwater, or where indicated, occasionally reached by high tides and in brackish water.

There are several former islands in the Tay, created by natural silting and artificial reclamation including: Big Island, Bloody Inches near Murthly, North Inch and South Inch in Perth,  Richards Islands, Sleepless Inch and The Inch near Inchtuthil.

See also
 Battle of the North Inch
 Loch Gorm Castle on Eilean Mòr in Loch Gorm, Islay
Mugdrum Island, which lies in tidal waters in the Firth of Tay.
List of islands of Scotland
List of lochs in Scotland
List of rivers in Scotland
Scottish island names
Waterfalls of Scotland

References and footnotes
General references
 Barrow, G.W.S. (ed.), The Kingdom of the Scots: Government, Church and Society from the Eleventh to the Fourteenth Century (2003) Edinburgh University Press. 
 Coventry, Martin (2008) Castles of the Clans. Musselburgh. Goblinshead. 
 General Register Office for Scotland (28 November 2003) Occasional Paper No 10: Statistics for Inhabited Islands. Retrieved 9 July 2007.
 Grant, Alexander "The Wolf of Badenoch" in W.D.H. Sellar (ed.) (1993) Moray: Province and People. Scottish Society for Northern Studies. Edinburgh; 
 
 
 Murray, Sir John and Pullar, Laurence (1910) Bathymetrical Survey of the Fresh-Water Lochs of Scotland, 1897-1909. London; Challenger Office.
 Ordnance Survey (2009) "Get-a-map". Retrieved January 2010.
Notes

Citations

Freshwater